Off the Menu: Asian America is a 2015 American documentary film by Grace Lee about Asian American culture, Asian cuisine, and how they relate to the culture of the United States.  It premiered in March 2015 at CAAMFest and aired on PBS in December 2015.

Synopsis 
Director Grace Lee travels to five states in the US to speak to Asian Americans about how food affects them and their culture.  Interviews include fishers who maintain the culture of traditional Hawaiian food, community members who are mourning after the Wisconsin Sikh temple shooting, the owners of an Asian fusion restaurant in New York City, and entrepreneurs  in Texas who have adapted Asian food to Southwestern tastes.  Other topics include authenticity and spirituality.

Production 
The idea of documentary on Asian food came at Lee's suggestion when the Center for Asian American Media asked her for ideas.  She wanted to explore Asian culture through a popular, accessible topic.  Lee said she discusses authenticity in Asian food to point out contradictions and raise questions, such as how authenticity can define one's identity and feed model minority issues.  Lee chose the locations after requesting ideas at a KQED community event.  She said that the stories were chosen for diversity and to explore the various ways people interact with food.  Lee described the documentary's focus as "what it means to be Asian American".

Release 
The film premiered at CAAMFest on March 15, 2015, and aired on PBS on December 8, 2015.

Reception 
Glenn Sumi of Now rated it 3/5 stars, writing that the Sikh segment makes the film "poignant and powerful" and "feel less like something you'd find on the Food Network".  Hua Hsu wrote in The New Yorker that the film's questions about authenticity "suggests relative privilege", in that immigrants are not able to focus on existential questions during their initial struggles in a new culture.  Hsu positions the film's chefs as part of a new Asian American tradition that rejects strict definitions of authenticity.

References

External links 
 
 Further interviews with the subjects of the documentary at PBS

2015 films
2015 documentary films
American documentary films
Documentary films about Asian Americans
Documentary films about food and drink
Films directed by Grace Lee
Asian-American cuisine
2010s English-language films
2010s American films